Bannes may refer to the following communes in France:

 Bannes, Lot, in the Lot department
 Bannes, Marne, in the Marne department
 Bannes, Haute-Marne, in the Haute-Marne department
 Bannes, Mayenne, in the Mayenne department